Francesco del Prato was an Italian still-life painter of the Renaissance period. He was first a goldsmith, but afterwards turned to painting, and put himself under the instruction of il Salviati. He died in 1562.

References

16th-century Italian painters
Italian male painters
Italian Renaissance painters
Italian still life painters
1562 deaths
Year of birth unknown